Shaibu Iddrissu (born 17 March 2000) is a Ghanaian professional footballer who plays as a left-back for Ghanaian Premier League side Karela United.

Career 
Iddrisu has been playing for Western Region-based club Karela United since 2019. He played 12 league matches in the 2019–20 Ghana Premier League season before the league was put on hold and later cancelled due to the COVID-19 pandemic. On 22 November 2020, at the end of the second match of the 2020–21 Ghana Premier League season against International Allies, he was adjudged the man of the match in a 1–0 win after helping the club keep a clean sheet.

References

External links 

 

Living people
2000 births
Ghanaian footballers
Ghana Premier League players
Karela United FC players
Association football defenders